Burate is a Papuan language of the Indonesian province of Papua, on the eastern shore of Cenderawasih Bay. The specific areas that the Burate language is spoken in include the Papua Provence, the Wapoga river mouth, one village of the Waropen Bawah subdistrict, and the Yapen Waropen regency. 

Burate is lexically similar to the East Geelvink Bay languages and presumably belongs in that family, but is too poorly attested to be sure.

References

Cenderawasih Bay
East Geelvink Bay languages
Languages of western New Guinea
Severely endangered languages
Yapen Islands